The Senegalese ambassador in Washington, D.C. is the official representative of the Government in Dakar to the Government of the United States.

List of representatives 

Senegal–United States relations

References 

 
United States
Senegal